The 1922 Oorang Indians season was their inaugural season in the league. The team finished 3–6, finishing eleventh in the league.

Schedule

Standings

References

Oorang Indians seasons
Oorang Indians
Oorang Indians
Oorang Indians